Sam Jam is an Indian Telugu-language web television talk show hosted by Samantha Ruth Prabhu. Directed by Arun Seshkumar and created by Allu Aravind for aha, the show premiered on 13 November 2020 on the streaming platform aha. It marks Samantha's second show as a host following the Telugu television reality series Bigg Boss 4.

Concept 
Guests who have come to the show share various experiences of their own. Host Samantha asks various questions on their personal life. Comedian Harsha Chemudu will be there along with Samantha and do some funny activities. Anybody from the audience can ask a question to the guest. Also, Samantha asks few things to the audience. In some episodes, talent artistes of various fields perform their skills. Mini tasks will be conducted by Samantha and the guests may win prizes

Production 
In the early 2020, producer Allu Aravind announced that a new talk show is about to launch on aha. But due to COVID-19 pandemic, the show got delayed. Finally, the show was officially announced on 6 November 2020. Promotional press meet was held that day. Allu Aravind announced that Samantha is hosting the show and B. V. Nandini Reddy will be the creative director of the show.

Episodes

Vijay Deverakonda is the first guest to enter the show followed by Rana Daggubati, Nag Ashwin, Tamannaah, Saina Nehwal, Parupalli Kashyap, Rakul Preet Singh, Krish Jagarlamudi, Chiranjeevi and Allu Arjun.

Reception 
While writing about the talk show, Karthik Keramalu of Film Companion stated that: "There’s a certain casualness and a sense of intimacy when a celebrity interviews another, and that seems to be the USP of many new talk shows in Telugu." Sakshi Post criticized the show by opining that Sam Jam is mishmash of other several Telugu programmes like Bathuku Jatka Bandi, Ali tho Saradaga and Cash.

References

External links 

 
 Sam Jam on aha

Indian television talk shows
Telugu-language web series
Indian web series
2020 Indian television series debuts
Aha (streaming service) original programming
2021 Indian television series endings